Bluna is an orange soft drink produced by the German Mineralbrunnen Überkingen-Teinach AG, the same company, which produces the better-known Afri-Cola, since 1994.

In 1952, the company F. Blumhoffer Nachfolger GmbH started to produce Bluna. It became a hit among consumers. In 1965, it also started being sold in cans.

Today, Bluna is sold in four flavors: orange (the original flavor), lime, lemon, and mandarin orange. It is sold in both 1- or 2-Liter bottles in stores and smaller 0.33-Liter bottles for restaurants.

Advertisement slogans for Bluna like "Sind wir nicht alle ein bisschen Bluna?" ("Aren't we all a bit Bluna?") and "Wie Bluna bist Du?" ("How Bluna are you?") have been very successful and the former has found its way into everyday language as shown by it being mentioned on several different internet forums and blogs.

Bluna was exported to Saudi Arabia from Germany during the 1980s and early 1990s, Today it's locally produced.

Citrus sodas
Products introduced in 1952